Novodruzhesk is an urban-type settlement in the Lysychansk Municipality, Luhansk Oblast (region) of Ukraine. Population: . Novodruzhesk originally established (in 1963) during Soviet-era of Ukraine, now is an urban settlement with a famous brewery plant.

Demographics 
Native language as of the Ukrainian Census of 2001:
Russian  55.4%
Ukrainian  40.9%
Belarusian  0.2%

References 

Cities in Luhansk Oblast
Populated places established in the Ukrainian Soviet Socialist Republic
Cities of district significance in Ukraine